Bob Dylan's Greatest Hits is a 1967 compilation album of songs by American singer-songwriter Bob Dylan. Released on March 27, 1967, by Columbia Records, it was a stopgap between Dylan's studio albums Blonde on Blonde and John Wesley Harding, during which time he had retreated from the public eye to recover from a motorcycle accident. It was Dylan's first compilation, containing every Top 40 single Dylan had up to 1967, plus additional album tracks which had become popular singles as recorded by other artists. Certified five times platinum by the RIAA, it is his best-selling album in the U.S.

Content

Greatest Hits presented Dylan's first appearance on records after his praised Blonde on Blonde double-LP of May 1966 and his motorcycle accident of that summer. With no activity by Dylan since the end of his recent world tour, and no new recordings on the immediate horizon (the sessions that would in part be released in June 1975 as The Basement Tapes were still months away), Columbia wanted new product to continue to capitalize on Dylan's commercial appeal, so released Bob Dylan's Greatest Hits, the label's first Dylan compilation.

Greatest Hits serves as Dylan's de facto singles collection for the 1960s. With the exception of "The Times They Are a-Changin'", "It Ain't Me Babe", and "Mr. Tambourine Man", all tracks on this album were released as 45 rpm singles in the United States during that decade. Several of the non-single tracks had been hit cover versions for other groups; in 1963 "Blowin' in the Wind" became a No. 2 hit single for Peter, Paul and Mary, and in 1965 Dylan's original recording made it to No. 9 as a single release in the United Kingdom. In 1965 a truncated rock and roll version of "Mr. Tambourine Man" had been a No. 1 hit for The Byrds in the summer, and the Turtles took a folk-rock version of "It Ain't Me Babe" to No. 8. "Just Like a Woman" had also been a No. 10 UK hit for Manfred Mann. The remaining six tracks all made the Billboard Top 40 in 1965 and 1966. "Positively 4th Street" was the only single of the collection not released on a long-playing album, having been recorded during the sessions for Highway 61 Revisited. Despite charting in both the US and UK, the 1965 standalone single "Can You Please Crawl Out Your Window?" was not included in the compilation.

When this album was remastered for its 1999 issue on compact disc 30 years later, a slightly longer alternative mix of "Positively 4th Street" was substituted for the original single version. In 2003, this album was released along with Dylan's two other greatest hits compilations in one four-disc boxed set, as Greatest Hits Volumes I–III.

An audiophile version of the album was released in August 2012, mastered by Steve Hoffman for the Audio Fidelity label as a 24-kt gold-plated CD. This disc is a limited edition of 5,000 individually numbered copies. Like the 1999 remaster, this CD contains a longer version of "Positively 4th Street."

Artwork

The cover photograph used on the cover of Bob Dylan's Greatest Hits was taken by Rowland Scherman at Dylan's November 28, 1965, concert in Washington, D.C. Bob Cato was the designer of the album cover, which won the 1967 Grammy award for "Best Album Cover, Photography". The original album package also included Milton Glaser's now-familiar "psychedelic" poster depicting Dylan. A similar image taken at the Concert for Bangladesh in 1971 was selected for Bob Dylan's Greatest Hits Vol. II, a compilation Dylan had much more control over. John Berg, senior art director at Columbia Records, recognized that a backlit image such as Scherman's would work because of Dylan's distinctive profile and hairstyle. It was his design, as well as Scherman's photo, that won the Grammy.

Track listing

Original release

Great Britain and Ireland
The UK release of the album had a slightly different track listing. "Positively 4th Street" was omitted, but "She Belongs to Me", "It's All Over Now, Baby Blue", and "One of Us Must Know (Sooner or Later)" were added. In the UK, this album was followed up by Bob Dylan's Greatest Hits 2, which repeated the Blonde on Blonde songs from the first Greatest Hits and also added "Absolutely Sweet Marie", "Just Like Tom Thumb's Blues", "Gates of Eden", "Chimes of Freedom", and several others. This album was different from the album called Bob Dylan's Greatest Hits Vol. II in the US, which was released in 1971 and called More Bob Dylan Greatest Hits in the UK.
 
 
 

Bob Dylan's Greatest Hits 2

Europe
Subtitled "Nobody sings Dylan like Dylan", this version was compiled in 1966. Only half of the 12 songs are also on the U.S. release. Songs from Blonde on Blonde are missing altogether.

Charts

Certifications

References

External links
 Bob Dylan singles chart positions

1967 greatest hits albums
Albums produced by Bob Johnston
Albums produced by John Hammond (producer)
Albums produced by Tom Wilson (record producer)
Bob Dylan compilation albums
Columbia Records compilation albums
Albums with cover art by Milton Glaser